Eska TV is a Polish free to air music channel launched on August 8, 2008 in Poland.

See also
 Television in Poland

References

Television channels and stations established in 2008
Television channels in Poland
Music television channels
Television channels and stations disestablished in 2016
Music organisations based in Poland